Noah Starr (born May 1  in Camden, Maine, United States) is an American actor, fight director and writer. He has made appearances on Late Night with Conan O'Brien (where he is a regular sketch player), MTV, AMC, Court TV, CNBC, E!, Maury Povich and in the upcoming feature film Nail Polish.

As a writer, he has written for a national advertising campaign, McSweeney's, Paramount Pictures and World Wrestling Entertainment.

As a fight director, Starr has worked with Nathan Lane, Andrea Martin and served as a stunt coordinator for a Kung Fu film. He was also an assistant to Broadway fight director Rick Sordelet (Lion King, Beauty and the Beast, The Scarlet Pimpernel).

In New York City, Starr has performed comedy at The Upright Citizens Brigade Theatre, Carolines on Broadway, Stand-Up NY, The People's Improv Theatre and Gotham City Improv. He has studied improvisation with Keith Johnstone (author of Impro), Rich Talarico (SNL), The Upright Citizens Brigade, The People's Improv Theatre, The Second City NYC and Chicago City Limits.

Starr is a founding member of The Milwaukee Theatre Collective, Collaborationtown and The Beautiful Ponies.

He was a co-star on Aida Mollenkamp's Food Network program Ask Aida for season 1, but has not appeared in season 2.

Currently he is the supervising producer at the internet show "Good Mythical Morning" hosted by Rhett and Link.

External links

American male television actors
Living people
1980 births
Action choreographers
People from Camden, Maine
Male actors from Maine